Paradise Township is the name of some places in the U.S. state of Pennsylvania:

Paradise Township, Lancaster County, Pennsylvania
Paradise Township, Monroe County, Pennsylvania
Paradise Township, York County, Pennsylvania

Pennsylvania township disambiguation pages